Saturday Night Country is a weekly Australian country music radio program. It is produced by the Australian Broadcasting Corporation and broadcast from 10:05 pm (in each local time zone) on Saturday nights. The current host is the country singer Beccy Cole.

History 

Felicity Urquhart hosted the show from March 2010 until December 2020. She took over the program from original host John Nutting who had hosted Saturday Night Country from the ABC North Queensland studios in Townsville, Queensland since its debut in 1993. During a temporary period of absence between 2013 and 2015, Catherine Britt filled in for Urquhart.

Nutting has explained that the program was launched during a period when the ABC was experiencing criticism for being too city-centric. He suggested a two-hour national country music program be broadcast from 4QN, the regional ABC station in Townsville, as a way to counteract accusations of the ABC focusing too much on capital cities. Nutting described the program's late Saturday night timeslot as a "bit of a dead spot" but the show quickly attracted a large following and was extended to a four-hour program.

Saturday Night Country broadcasts on regional ABC Local Radio stations and digital station ABC Country. The program is also streamed on the show's website. 

Until January 2017, Saturday Night Country was also broadcast on the ABC's metropolitan AM radio stations in state capital cities, but in late 2016 the ABC decided to replace the AM program in those markets with a Saturday night edition of Nightlife.  Saturday Night Country continues to be available to listeners in the major metropolitan markets via ABC Country on DAB digital radio and on the ABC’s online streaming platforms. 

After 500 shows and more than 2,000 hours of programming, Felicity Urquhart signed off as host of Saturday Night Country. Her last show was on 26 December 2020.

Current host 

During January 2021, the ABC announced that Beccy Cole would host the show. Her inaugural appearance as host was on 13 February 2021 and her first feature guest was Adam Harvey. Cole is based in Adelaide and broadcasts from the ABC's Collinswood studios in her home city. The new Cole-hosted show runs for three hours from 10:05 pm on Saturdays. This is a one hour reduction from the previous four-hour show.

After the program’s December 2021 - January 2022 summer hiatus, the live program resumed during February 2022 but without Beccy Cole hosting.  Amber Lawrence was the program's temporary host until Cole resumed on 30 April 2022.

References 

Australian Broadcasting Corporation radio programs
Australian radio programs
1990s Australian radio programs
2000s Australian radio programs
2010s Australian radio programs
2020s Australian radio programs